Kelly Sullivan (born February 3, 1978) is an American actress. She is known for her role as Kate Howard on the ABC daytime soap opera General Hospital, which she portrayed from September 2011 until August 2013, before reappearing briefly in October 2014. She also played Sage Warner on the CBS daytime soap opera The Young and the Restless from October 28, 2014 to June 22, 2016. She starred as Bonnie Hayes in the TLC drama series Too Close to Home.

Early life and education
Born in Puyallup, Washington, Sullivan graduated with honors from the University of Arizona.

Career
Sullivan played Kate Howard and eventually the character's alternate personality, Connie Falconeri, on the ABC daytime soap opera General Hospital from September 2011 until August 2013. She took over the role from actress Megan Ward, and in 2012 told MSN Entertainment, "recasting is never easy".

From 2014–16, Sullivan played Sage Warner on the CBS soap opera The Young and the Restless. In 2016, she was cast as Bonnie Hayes in the Tyler Perry drama series Too Close to Home on TLC.

Theater
After graduating from the University of Arizona, Sullivan got her first Broadway show role in Contact at the Vivian Beaumont Theater in New York City; she also was featured in Bells Are Ringing and Young Frankenstein.

Filmography

Stage

Awards and nominations

References

External links

1978 births
American soap opera actresses
American television actresses
University of Arizona alumni
Living people
People from Puyallup, Washington
21st-century American actresses